Vladimir Mikhailovich Dolgopolov (24 December 1961 – 12 June 2016) was a Russian professional footballer. Dolgopolov made his debut in the Soviet Top League in 1980, playing for FC Zenit Leningrad, for which he won a Master of Sports of the USSR award.

In January 2016, Dolgopolov was found guilty of negligent homicide, and six-months into his sentence died due to complications from a stroke.

Personal life 
Vladimir Mikhailovich Dolgopolov was born on 24 December 1961, in Leningrad (now Saint Petersburg), Soviet Union. Dolgopolov had been married twice: to his first wife for 9 years, and later in 1991 he married his second wife, an air stewardess named Natalia, with whom he had a daughter, Daria.

Honors
 Soviet Top League champion: 1984
 Soviet Top League bronze: 1980
 USSR Federation Cup finalist: 1986

European club competitions
With FC Zenit Leningrad.

 1987–88 UEFA Cup: 2 games
 1989–90 UEFA Cup: 4 games

Murder conviction 
In September 2014, Dolgopolov was arrested on suspicion of murdering his wife, Natalia, and on 21 January 2016, he was found guilty of negligent homicide and sentenced to 10 years of imprisonment.

Death 
On 20 May 2016, Dolgopolov suffered a stroke while serving his sentence in Kresty Prison in Saint Petersburg. On 12 June 2016, he died in prison hospital.

References

1961 births
2016 deaths
Soviet footballers
Russian footballers
FC Zenit Saint Petersburg players
FC Dynamo Moscow players
Soviet Top League players
Russian expatriate footballers
Expatriate footballers in Finland
Expatriate footballers in Estonia
Russian expatriate sportspeople in Finland
Russian expatriate sportspeople in Estonia
Russian people convicted of murder
Association football defenders
Inmates of Kresty Prison
Prisoners who died in Russian detention
FC Dynamo Saint Petersburg players
FC Lokomotiv Saint Petersburg players